Juverna was a schooner launched at Portaferry in 1804. She immediately became a slave ship in the triangular trade in enslaved people. She made one complete slave voyage. A French squadron captured her in late 1805 or early 1806 before she could embark any slaves on her second slave voyage.

Career 
Juverna first appeared in Lloyd's Register (LR) in 1804.

1st slave voyage (1804–1805): Captain Robert Lewis sailed from Liverpool on 29 July 1804. He acquired slaves at Calabar. Juverna arrived at Suriname on 1 April 1805 with 89 slaves. She had taken on 110 male and female slaves, two of whom died before she left Africa. On her way to the West Indies she stopped at Prince's Island to allow the slaves to bathe. During the voyage to Suriname another 19 slaves died.

At Suriname the ship's doctor and nine seamen deserted. She sailed from Suriname on 12 June 1805. She sailed in convoy. During her voyage to the United Kingdom  pressed one of her crew. Juverna arrived back at Liverpool on 23 July. She had left with 20 crew members and had suffered four crew deaths on her voyage. She brought 145 bags of sugar and 58 bales of cotton from Suriname.

2nd slave voyage (1805–loss): Captain Thomas Brassey sailed from Liverpool on 16 November 1805.

The French put all the captured crews on Active and sent her back to England. Juverna had left Liverpool with 17 crew members and had suffered one crew death on her voyage. The squadron burnt the other vessels that they had captured. The captains arrived at Waterford on 12 May on the cartel Active.

Citations

1804 ships
Age of Sail merchant ships of England
Liverpool slave ships
Captured ships